Aleksander Pärn (1891–?) was an Estonian politician. He was a member of the I Riigikogu, representing the Estonian Independent Socialist Workers' Party and of the III Riigikogu, representing the Estonian Socialist Workers' Party. He was a member of the Riigikogu since 3 January 1923. He replaced Karl Stallmeister.

References

1891 births
Year of death missing
Estonian Independent Socialist Workers' Party politicians
Estonian Socialist Workers' Party politicians
Members of the Riigikogu, 1920–1923
Members of the Riigikogu, 1926–1929